Lameck Mbao (born 2 January 1963) is a Zambian boxer. He competed in the men's lightweight event at the 1988 Summer Olympics. At the 1988 Summer Olympics, he lost to Azzedine Saïd of Algeria.

References

1963 births
Living people
Zambian male boxers
Olympic boxers of Zambia
Boxers at the 1988 Summer Olympics
Place of birth missing (living people)
Lightweight boxers